The Triumphs of Caesar are a series of nine large paintings created by the Italian Renaissance artist Andrea Mantegna between 1484 and 1492 for the Gonzaga Ducal Palace, Mantua. They depict a triumphal military parade celebrating the victory of Julius Caesar in the Gallic Wars. Acknowledged from the time of Mantegna as his greatest masterpiece, they remain the most complete pictorial representation of a Roman triumph ever attempted and together they form the world's largest metric area of Italian Renaissance paintings outside Italy. Acquired by Charles I in 1629, they now form part of the Royal Collection at Hampton Court Palace near London, where they occupy a special gallery, with a new continuous frame intended to capture their original setting, mounted into panelling.

Originally painted in the fragile medium of egg and glue tempera on canvas, the paintings underwent successive repaintings and restorations through the centuries, and are damaged in many areas.  Each canvas measures 2.66 × 2.78 m. In total they cover an area more than 70 metres square.

Subject 
The series depicts Caesar on a triumphal chariot returning from his successful campaigns, in a procession of Roman soldiers, standard-bearers, musicians and the spoils of war including an assortment of booty (including arms, intricate sculpture and gold vases), exotic animals and captives. These paintings celebrate two of Julius Caesar's greatest campaigns – his victory over the Gauls and the recovery of Pontus in Asia Minor. Mantegna was inspired by written accounts of Caesar's celebratory processions through Rome as well as Roman antiquities in the Duke's collection.

Giorgio Vasari described them as follows: "We can see grouped and cleverly arranged in the Triumph the ornate and beautiful chariot, the figure of a man cursing the victorious hero, the victor's relations, the perfumes, incense and sacrifices, the priests, the bulls crowned for sacrifice, the prisoners, the booty captured by the troops, the rank of the squadrons, the elephants, the spoils, the victories and the cities represented in various chariots, along with a mass of trophies on spears, and with helmets and armour, headgear of all kinds, ornaments and countless pieces of plate."

History 
The Triumphs of Caesar were initially painted from 1484 to 1492 for the Ducal Palace in Mantua, commissioned by either the Duke Federico I Gonzaga or, more likely, his son Francesco II.

The Gonzaga dynasty died out in the male line, and the major part of their painting collection was acquired by Charles I of England in 1629, using as an agent in Italy, the courtier Daniel Nys. The collection also included works by Titian, Raphael and Caravaggio. The Triumphs arrived in 1630 at Hampton Court Palace, where they have remained ever since. The Lower Orangery was originally built to house Mary II of England's larger tender plants. It was chosen as a setting for the series, since it re-creates the interior of the Palace of San Sebastiano in Mantua, Italy, where the paintings were hung from 1506 in a specially built gallery.  The paintings are displayed as a continuous frieze, separated by small columns.

After the execution of Charles I in 1649, the Triumphs were listed in an inventory and valued at 1,000 pounds; the entire Gonzaga acquisition cost 25,000 pounds. Oliver Cromwell refrained from selling these paintings, almost alone among Charles's collection, due to their fame, and perhaps as they celebrated a general like himself rather than a monarch or Catholic religious theme.

Reception and influence

The Triumphs of Caesar were described as "the best thing Mantegna ever painted" by Giorgio Vasari in his celebrated Lives of the Artists.
They rapidly became extremely famous throughout Europe, principally through copies in print form, of which many different versions were made, starting with a contemporary set from Mantegna's own workshop. Between 1517 and 1519, Hans Holbein the Younger, using prints, painted a copy of the work on nine exterior panels of the Hertenstein House in Lucerne, now demolished. Andrea Aspertini (1558–1629) made prints of the paintings in Mantua.

Early 20th century restoration
The painter and critic Roger Fry undertook a restoration of The Picture Bearers starting in 1910. This was approved by Lionel Cust, Keeper of the King's Pictures. Fry removed what Louis Laguerre had done a century before, and worked on and off for eleven years, with assistance from Paul Nash and Dora Carrington, to repaint parts of the canvas. The art historian Frances Spalding holds that Fry made many poor artistic and technical decisions, "and, worst of all, they changed the Negro standard bearer into a Caucasian". Fry did not attempt to restore any of the other paintings in the series, and said in 1925 that The Picture Bearers was "one of [his] maddest follies".

1960s restoration
The paintings had so deteriorated that visitors in the 19th century deplored their condition. In the 1960s a careful restoration to reveal the original paintwork was conducted on all but the seventh canvas, where no trace had been left by previous restorers. Although now mere shadows of Mantegna's cinquecento paintings, they still convey a powerful impression of epic grandeur. In the words of Anthony Blunt, who as Surveyor of the Queen's Pictures supervised the restoration, "The Triumphs may be a ruin but it is a noble one, one as noble as those of ancient Rome which Mantegna so deeply admired."

Art critic Tom Lubbock, writing about the restored paintings called the pictures "the epitome of Renaissance art in the service of state power – they carry a powerful sense of inexorable procession – impressing the viewer with the inexhaustible quantity of available power and plunder."

The series is now displayed to the public under low level electric light for conservation reasons.

Copies of the paintings were made in the early 17th century by Ludovico Dondi.

Newly discovered drawing 
A newly discovered drawing was sold for US$11.65m at Sotheby's, New York in 2020. It was the most expensive Old Master drawing sold in the United States. The drawing, before it was reattributed to the Italian Renaissance master, first appeared in a small auction in Germany and sold for less than US$1,000. The work was totally unknown to scholars until its inclusion in the Mantegna and Bellini exhibitions in London and Berlin. It caught the attention of Italian specialist in Sotheby's Old Master Drawings Department. She said: ‘By examination under special filtered infrared light, we were able to detect the hidden figure of Helios, revealing a major change in the composition that proves Mantegna’s authorship. This change in fact defined his whole approach to the finished painting that we see today.’

Gallery

Literary sources
The Latin texts have been replaced by English translations.

Notes

References

, Viareggio Prize 2006 (in Italian)

 (in French)

, reference monograph

, translation by George Bull.

External links
Official description, online catalogue of the Royal Collection

1480s paintings
1490s paintings
1500s paintings
Paintings by Andrea Mantegna
Paintings in the Royal Collection of the United Kingdom
Military art
Hampton Court Palace
Gonzaga art collection
Dogs in art
Horses in art
Musical instruments in art
Elephants in art
Paintings depicting Julius Caesar